is a professional Japanese baseball player. He is a pitcher for the Hanshin Tigers of Nippon Professional Baseball (NPB).

References 

1997 births
Living people
Baseball people from Akita Prefecture
Nippon Professional Baseball pitchers
Hanshin Tigers players
People from Akita (city)